The Palapa oath was an oath taken by Gajah Mada, a 14th-century Prime Minister of the Javanese Majapahit Empire described in the Pararaton (Book of Kings). In this oath Gajah Mada swore that he would not taste any spice, as long as he had not succeeded in unifying Nusantara (the Malay archipelago). The oath was taken during his inauguration as Majapahit Amangkubhumi (Prime Minister) that took place in 1256 Saka (1334) or 1258 Saka (1336).

The oath
The main source of the Palapa oath is taken from the middle Javanese manuscript, Pararaton, which states:

Sira Gajah Madapatih Amangkubhumi tan ayun amuktia palapa, sira Gajah Mada: "Lamun huwus kalah nusantara isun amukti palapa, lamun kalah ring Gurun, ring Seran, Tañjung Pura, ring Haru, ring Pahang, Dompo, ring Bali, Sunda, Palembang, Tumasik, samana isun amukti palapa".

Translation:

He, Gajah Mada Patih Amangkubumi, does not wish to cease his fasting. Gajah Mada: "If (I succeed) in defeating (conquering) Nusantara, (then) I will break my fast. If Gurun, Seram, Tanjung Pura, Haru, Pahang, Dompo, Bali, Sunda, Palembang, Temasek, are all defeated, (then) I will break my fast.".

Interpretation 
The term palapa is an Old Javanese term for "coconut". It also might be used to refer to pala (nutmeg) to describe "spices" or flavourings in food. Palapa can also be interpreted as the combination pala-apa, which means any fruit or spices. The oath means that Gajah Mada would not eat palapa until he succeeded in uniting the Nusantara archipelago under Majapahit suzerainty. Historians have interpreted that Gajah Mada might have performed what is now known in Javanese tradition as puasa mutih, only consuming plain food of white steamed rice, plain vegetables and clear water, without any coconut or spices for flavouring. Some might also interpret this to mean Gajah Mada was somehow performing a somewhat ascetic ritual by refusing to indulge himself in sensual pleasures, which includes consuming spiced flavoursome food. This oath was probably meant to describe his seriousness and strong will in achieving his goal of furthering the glory of Majapahit.

From this manuscript, historians have learnt several names of places and polities in Nusantara at the time the oath was taken, which were not under Majapahit suzerainty, and were targeted by Gajah Mada's ambitious expansive campaign.

Places described in Palapa oath 

 Gurun = Gorom islands, east of Seram
 Seran = Seram
 Tañjung Pura = Tanjungpura Kingdom, Ketapang Regency, West Kalimantan
 Haru = Aru Kingdom, North Sumatra (Karo)
 Pahang = Pahang, Malaysia
 Dompo = Dompu in Sumbawa island
 Bali = Bali
 Sunda = Sunda Kingdom
 Palembang = Palembang or Srivijaya
 Tumasik = Singapore

Completion 
It is possible that the Sunda kingdom became vassalized by Majapahit after the Bubat tragedy of 1357. It ultimately regained independence at unknown year. The subjugation of Sunda by Majapahit means that Gajah Mada has finally fulfilled his Palapa oath:... Tunggalan padompo pasunda, samangkana sira Gajah Mada mukti palapa. (Unified after the conquest of Dompo and Sunda, thus Gajah Mada eats palapa.)

Legacy
The Palapa oath is used as the name of the Indonesian telecommunication satellite Palapa, a Boeing-made satellite. The program was started in February 1975 and the satellite was launched on 9 July 1976, from Cape Caneveral, United States.  The name Palapa was chosen by President Suharto and means 'fruits of labor', also signifying the Indonesian effort to unify the Indonesian archipelago through telecommunication technology.

A university-wide orientation session for freshman students at Gadjah Mada University, PPSMB Palapa, is named after the oath.

See also 
 Nagarakretagama
 Kidung Sunda
 Territories of Majapahit

References

Majapahit